Jean de Beaumetz is recorded to have been "painter and valet" to Philip the Bold, for whom he painted numerous works, and decorated, among other chapels, that of the Castle of Argilli, in Burgundy. Some of his mural paintings are still preserved at château de Germolles. Jean de Beaumetz was employed by his patron from about 1375 to 1395.

References
 

14th-century French painters
French male painters
Year of birth unknown
Year of death unknown
Gothic painters